Mount Frey (also known as Frey Peak) is a mountain peak location at  in northwest of Sikkim, India.

Location 
This summit of the Frey Peak is located in the neighborhood of Rathong, Kabru, and Kotkhang. On its north, Rathong Glacier is located.

This mountain is named after the mountaineer George Frey, who perished climbing this peak with Tenzing Norgey in 1951. Tenzing Norgey advised George Frey to put on his crampons, but George Frey disregarded this advice and continued climbing without them. As a tribute to George Frey, his ice axe and crampons are still left where they fell at the base of Frey Peak.

Climbing history 
In 1990, the peak was opened for the purpose of climbing.

References 

Mountains of Sikkim
Five-thousanders of the Transhimalayas